St. Paul the Apostle Church is a historic Catholic church in the city of Mechanicville, New York, United States of America. It is presently part of the parish of All Saints on the Hudson.

History 
The church is named for Saint Paul the Apostle. Its cornerstone was laid on Sunday, June 2, 1912, by Bishop Thomas M. A. Burke, and it was dedicated on Sunday, October 14, 1917, by Bishop Thomas F. Cusack.

Architecture 
The present edifice was designed in the Gothic revival style by the architect, Edward W. Loth, of Troy, New York. The church is in the cruciform shape, with an overall length of 148', and an overall width of 98' across the transepts. The tower stands at 146', and the front gable stands at 79' from grade to apex.

Exterior 
The church is a steel and masonry structure clad with Potsdam sandstone in a random ashlar pattern. The trim work is of cast stone, made using the crushings of the aforementioned sandstone.

Interior 
The walls are typically of plaster on lath, with a board-and-batten wainscot of oak. The ceiling employs rib vaulting, and is made from plaster, and ornamented with bas-relief with a grapevine and leaf motif. The sanctuary is illuminated by a skylight.

Stained Glass Windows 
The stained glass windows were made by the Pike Glass Studio of Rochester, NY, and are reminiscent of the Munich-style of stained glass. They are typically lancet windows with wood tracery, and depict events from the life of Saint Paul.

Stations of the Cross 
The Stations of the Cross are of plaster, and were made by the Joseph Sibbel Studio of New York City. The niches are highly decorated, and feature a canopy with a central crocketed spire, cusped tracery, and flanking pinnacles. The figures were modeled from live subjects, and are a combination of high and low relief.

Bell 
The bell was manufactured by the Meneely & Kimberly foundry of Troy, NY, in the year 1872. It is a bronze bell weighing approximately 1900 lbs. and was moved from the previous edifice to the present church on Tuesday, July 15, 1919. The inscription is in Latin and reads "Uni Trinoque Deo, in Honorem, B. V. M. [Beata Virgo Maria] De Consolatione, SS. Augustini et Monica, Congregatio S. Pauli Apost, Mechanicville, Dicavit, Anno Dni [Domini] 1872 Philippo Izzo, O.S.A. [Ordo Sancti Augustini], Parocho" (in English "To the Triune God, in honor of the Blessed Virgin Mary of Consolation, Saints Augustine and Monica, and the Congregation of Saint Paul the Apostle, Mechanicville, dedicated in the year of our Lord, 1872, by Philip Izzo, Order of Saint Augustine, Pastor").

Image gallery

References 

Roman Catholic churches completed in 1917
Roman Catholic churches in New York (state)
Roman Catholic parishes of Diocese of Albany
1852 establishments in New York (state)
Churches in Saratoga County, New York
Religious organizations established in 1852
Religious organizations disestablished in 1977
20th-century Roman Catholic church buildings in the United States